Estrella del norte, estrella norte, or, variation, may refer to:

Places
 Karapaí, Amambay, Paraguay; a municipality nicknamed "Estrella del Norte"

Facilities and structures
 Estrella del Norte, Olanchito, Honduras; a secondary school
 Estrella del Norte, Metro Manila, Philippines; a shopping mall, see List of shopping malls in Metro Manila
 La Estrella del Norte, Manila, Philippines; a demolished Art Deco building, see List of Art Deco architecture in Asia
 Estrella del Norte, Manila, Philippines; a department store destroyed in WWII, see Department stores by country
 Estrella del Norte, Villa Muñoz, Montevideo, Uruguay; a women's prison
 La Estrella del Norte, Playas, New Mexico, USA; a landmark in the Playas CDP

Arts, entertainment, media

Newspapers
 La Estrella Norte, a Spanish-language newspaper based in Mayagüez, Puerto Rico, USA
 La Estrella del Norte, a newspaper founded in Antofagasta in 1966 in Chile

Songs
 "Estrella del norte" (song), a 1987 song by Mango off the album Adesso
 "Estrella del norte" (song), a folksong written by Manuel Ponce

Other uses
 Estrella del Norte, an Argentinian train service run by the Central Argentine Railway
  Estrella del Norte train accident in 1978 in Sa Pereira, Argentina
 Estrella del Norte, a soccer team located in Amambay, Paraguay; see List of football clubs in Paraguay

See also

 Norte (disambiguation)
 Estrella (disambiguation)
 Estrela do Norte (disambiguation)
 Étoile du Nord (disambiguation)
 Nordstern (disambiguation)
 Nordstar (disambiguation)
 Northstar (disambiguation)
 North Star (disambiguation)
 Northern Star (disambiguation)
 Star of the North (disambiguation)